The 1989 Southwest Outdoor Soccer League season was the first outdoor and fourth overall season of the Southwest Indoor Soccer League.

Overview
After running three winter indoor seasons beginning in 1986, the Southwest Indoor Soccer League added its first summer outdoor season in 1989.  With the move outdoors, the league added the Colorado Comets and Tulsa Renegades who quickly proved their worth when they finished at the top of the standing.  The move outdoor brought a short-lived name change as the league rebranded itself as the Southwest Outdoor Soccer League.  The season began on May 27, 1989.

League standings

Semifinal
 The Addison Arrows defeated the Tulsa Renegades: 1-1 (PK), 1-4, 0-0 (PK)

Final

Honors
 Most Valuable Player:  Kelvin Norman, Colorado Comets 
 Top Scorer:  Don Gallegos, Colorado Comets (13 goals)
 Assist Leader:  Chino Melendez, Colorado Comets; Steve Hayes, Tulsa Renegades (8 assists each)
 Top Goalkeeper:  Craig Lemmering, Colorado Comets
 Coach of the Year:  Ed Eid, Colorado Comets

References

External links
The Year in American Soccer - 1989

3
USISL outdoor seasons (1989–1994)